Degrowth is a term used for both a political, economic, and social movement as well as a set of theories that critique the paradigm of economic growth. It can be described as an extensive framework that is based on critiques of the growth-centered economic system in which we are living. Degrowth is based on ideas from a diverse range of lines of thought such as political ecology, ecological economics, feminist political ecology, and environmental justice, pointing out the social and ecological harm caused by the pursuit of infinite growth and Western "development" imperatives.

Degrowth emphasizes the need to reduce global consumption and production (social metabolism) and advocates a socially just and ecologically sustainable society with social and environmental well-being replacing GDP as the indicator of prosperity. Hence, although GDP is likely to shrink in a "Degrowth society", i.e. a society in which the objectives of the degrowth movement are achieved, this is not the primary objective of degrowth. The main argument degrowth raises is that an infinite expansion of the economy is fundamentally contradictory to finite planetary boundaries. Degrowth highlights the importance of autonomy, care work, self-organization, commons, community, open localism, work sharing, happiness and conviviality.

Background
The "degrowth" movement arose from concerns over the consequences of the productivism and consumerism associated with industrial societies (whether capitalist or socialist) including:
 The reduced availability of energy sources (see peak oil)
 The declining quality of the environment (see global warming, pollution, threats to biodiversity)
 The decline in the health of flora and fauna upon which humans depend (see Holocene extinction)
 The rise of negative societal side-effects (see unsustainable development, poorer health, poverty)
 The ever-expanding use of resources by First World countries to satisfy lifestyles that consume more food and energy, and produce greater waste, at the expense of the Third World (see neocolonialism)

In academia, a study gathered degrowth proposals and defined the movement with three main goals: (1) Reduce the environmental impact of human activity; (2) Redistribute income and wealth both within and between countries; (3) Promote the transition from a materialistic to a convivial and participatory society.A newer, open-access review is available. 
Degrowth is related to more general bodies of knowledge in a 2023 anthology.

Decoupling 

The concept of decoupling denotes that it is possible to decouple economic growth, usually measured in GDP growth, from the use of natural resources and greenhouse gas (GHG) emissions. Absolute decoupling refers to GDP growth coinciding with a reduction in natural resource use and GHG emissions, while relative decoupling describes an increase in resource use and GHG emission which is lower than the increase in GDP growth. The degrowth movement heavily critiques this idea and argues that absolute decoupling is only possible for short periods, specific locations or with small mitigation rates. Moreover, there is no empirical evidence that decoupling will happen fast enough and on a global scale. A recent literature review called “Decoupling Debunked: Evidence and arguments against green growth as a sole strategy for sustainability” analyzed a large amount of empirical and theoretical work on the topic and concludes that:

“not only is there no empirical evidence supporting the existence of a decoupling of economic growth from environmental pressures on anywhere near the scale needed to deal with environmental breakdown, but also, and perhaps more importantly, such decoupling appears unlikely to happen in the future.” (Page 3).

Further, the paper states that reported cases of “successful” decoupling either depict relative decoupling and/or are observed only temporarily and/or only on a local scale. This is supported by several other studies who state that absolute decoupling is highly unlikely to be achieved fast enough to prevent global warming over 1.5 °C or 2 °C, even under optimistic policy conditions. Moreover, relying on decoupling as the main or only strategy to combine economic growth and the reduction of environmental pressures equals taking a large risk to our future well-being. Consequently, degrowth advocates argue that we need to look for alternatives.

Resource depletion

As economies grow, the need for resources grows accordingly (unless there are changes in efficiency or demand for different products due to price changes). There is a fixed supply of non-renewable resources, such as petroleum (oil), and these resources will inevitably be depleted. Renewable resources can also be depleted if extracted at unsustainable rates over extended periods. For example, this has occurred with caviar production in the Caspian Sea. There is much concern as to how growing demand for these resources will be met as supplies decrease. Many organizations and governments look to energy technologies such as biofuels, solar cells, and wind turbines to meet the demand gap after peak oil. Others have argued that none of the alternatives could effectively replace the versatility and portability of oil. Authors of the book Techno-Fix criticize technological optimists for overlooking the limitations of technology in solving agricultural and social challenges arising from growth.

Proponents of degrowth argue that decreasing demand is the only way of permanently closing the demand gap. For renewable resources, demand, and therefore production, must also be brought down to levels that prevent depletion and are environmentally healthy. Moving toward a society that is not dependent on oil is seen as essential to avoiding societal collapse when non-renewable resources are depleted. Degrowth can also be seen as a call for resource shifting where one strives to put an end to the unsustainable social processes of turning things into resources, for example non-renewable natural resources, and turn instead other things into resources, for example, renewable human resources.

Ecological footprint

The ecological footprint is a measure of human demand on the Earth's ecosystems. It compares human demand with planet Earth's ecological capacity to regenerate. It represents the amount of biologically productive land and sea area needed to regenerate the resources a human population consumes and to absorb and render harmless the corresponding waste.
According to a 2005 Global Footprint Network report, inhabitants of high-income countries live off of 6.4 global hectares (gHa), while those from low-income countries live off of a single gHa. For example, while each inhabitant of Bangladesh lives off of what they produce from 0.56 gHa, a North American requires 12.5 gHa. Each inhabitant of North America uses 22.3 times as much land as a Bangladeshi. According to the same report, the average number of global hectares per person was 2.1, while current consumption levels have reached 2.7 hectares per person. In order for the world's population to attain the living standards typical of European countries, the resources of between three and eight planet Earths would be required with current levels of efficiency and means of production. In order for world economic equality to be achieved with the current available resources, proponents say rich countries would have to reduce their standard of living through degrowth. The constraints on resources would eventually lead to a forced reduction in consumption. Controlled reduction of consumption would reduce the trauma of this change assuming no technological changes increase the planet's carrying capacity.

Degrowth and sustainable development 

Degrowth thought is in opposition to all forms of productivism (the belief that economic productivity and growth is the purpose of human organization). It is, thus, opposed to the current form of sustainable development. While the concern for sustainability does not contradict degrowth, sustainable development is rooted in mainstream development ideas that aim to increase economic growth and consumption. Degrowth therefore sees sustainable development as an oxymoron, as any development based on growth in a finite and environmentally stressed world is seen as inherently unsustainable.
Critics of degrowth argue that a slowing of economic growth would result in increased unemployment, increased poverty, and decreased income per capita. Many who understand the devastating environmental consequences of growth still advocate for economic growth in the South, even if not in the North. But, a slowing of economic growth would fail to deliver the benefits of degrowth—self-sufficiency, material responsibility—and would indeed lead to decreased employment. Rather, degrowth proponents advocate the complete abandonment of the current (growth) economic model, suggesting that relocalizing and abandoning the global economy in the Global South would allow people of the South to become more self-sufficient and would end the overconsumption and exploitation of Southern resources by the North. Proponents of degrowth see it as a possible path to preserve ecosystems from human pressures. In this idea, the environment is communally cared for, integrating humans and nature; degrowth implies the perception of ecosystems as inherently valuable, not just as a source of resources. At the Second International Conference on degrowth, ideas such as a maximum wage and open borders were discussed. There's also an acknowledgement with degrowth that population growth is not the central issue to the need for industrial growth, because larger populations in the global South may use far fewer resources than a handful of individuals in the global North. Degrowth suggests a deontological shift so that lifestyles that involve a high level of resource consumption are no longer seen as attractive. Other visions of degrowth include the global North repairing past injustices from centuries of colonization and exploitation, and redistributing wealth, and a concept of the appropriate scale of action is a major topic of debate within degrowth movements.

Some researchers believe that the world will have to pass through Great Transformation, "by design or by disaster", therefore ecological economics have to incorporate Postdevelopment theories, Buen vivir and degrowth if they want to really change something.

A 2022 paper by Mark Diesendorf found that limiting global warming to 1,5 degrees with no overshoot would require a reduction of energy consumption. It describes (chapters 4-5) degrowth toward a steady state economy as something possible and probably positive. The study ends with the words: “The case for a transition to a steady-state economy with low throughput and low emissions, initially in the high-income economies and then in rapidly growing economies, needs more serious attention and international cooperation.

"Rebound effect"

Technologies designed to reduce resource use and improve efficiency are often touted as sustainable or green solutions. Degrowth literature, however, warns about these technological advances due to the "rebound effect", also known as Jevons paradox. This concept is based on observations that when a less resource-exhaustive technology is introduced, behavior surrounding the use of that technology may change, and consumption of that technology could increase or even offset any potential resource savings. In light of the rebound effect, proponents of degrowth hold that the only effective "sustainable" solutions must involve a complete rejection of the growth paradigm and a move to a degrowth paradigm. There are also fundamental limits to technological solutions in the pursuit of degrowth, as all engagements with technology increase the cumulative matter-energy throughput. However, the convergence of digital commons of knowledge and design with distributed manufacturing technologies may arguably hold potential for building degrowth future scenarios.

Mitigation of climate change and determinants of 'growth'

Scientists report that degrowth scenarios, where economic output either "declines" or declines in terms of contemporary economic metrics such as current GDP, have been neglected in considerations of 1.5 °C scenarios reported by the Intergovernmental Panel on Climate Change (IPCC), finding that investigated degrowth scenarios "minimize many key risks for feasibility and sustainability compared to technology-driven pathways" with a core problem of such being feasibility in the context of contemporary decision-making of politics and globalized rebound- and relocation-effects. However, structurally realigning 'economic growth' and socioeconomic activity determination-structures may not be widely debated in both the degrowth community and in degrowth research which may largely focus on reducing economic growth either more generally or without structural alternative but with e.g. nonsystemic political interventions. Similarly, many green growth advocates suggest that contemporary socioeconomic mechanisms and metrics – including for economic growth – can be continued with forms of nonstructural "energy-GDP decoupling". A study concluded that public services are associated with higher human need satisfaction and lower energy requirements while contemporary forms of economic growth are linked with the opposite, with the contemporary economic system being fundamentally misaligned with the twin goals of meeting human needs and ensuring ecological sustainability, suggesting that prioritizing human well-being and ecological sustainability would be preferable over growth in current metrics of economic growth. The word 'degrowth' was mentioned 28 times in the United Nations' IPCC Sixth Assessment Report by Working Group III published in April 2022.

Easterlin Paradox 
In 1973, Richard Easterlin published a paper entitled "Does Economic Growth Improve the Human Lot? Some Empirical Evidence" which finds that after a certain income level or "satiation point", income has no effect on happiness levels. The Easterlin Paradox has been reassessed multiple times with varying conclusions. Furthermore, Easterlin writes consumption levels directly correlate with income level, indicating that after reaching a certain satiation point increased consumption has no effect on happiness levels.

Open Localism 

Open localism is a concept that has been promoted by the degrowth community when envisioning an alternative set of social relations and economic organization. It builds upon the political philosophies of localism and is based on values such as diversity, ecologies of knowledge, and openness. Open localism does not look to create an enclosed community but rather circulate production locally in an open and integrative manner.

Open localism is a direct challenge to the acts of closure that occur in terms of identitarian politics. By producing and consuming as much as possible locally, community members enhance their relationships with one another and the surrounding environment.

Degrowth's ideas around open localism share some similarities with ideas around the commons while also having clear differences. On the one hand, open localism promotes localized, common production in cooperative-like styles similar to some versions of how commons are organized. On the other hand, open localism does not impose any set of rules or regulations creating a defined boundary, rather it favours a cosmopolitan approach.

Feminism 

The degrowth movement builds on feminist economics that have criticized measures of economic growth like the GDP as it excludes work mainly done by women such as unpaid care work, that is the work performed to fulfill people's needs, and reproductive work, that is the work sustaining life, first argued by Marilyn Waring. Further, degrowth draws on the critique of socialist feminists like Silvia Federici and Nancy Fraser claiming that capitalist growth builds on the exploitation of women's work. Instead of devaluing it, degrowth centers the economy around care, proposing that care work should be organized as a commons.

Centering care goes hand in hand with changing society's time regimes. Degrowth scholars propose a working time reduction. As this does not necessarily lead to gender justice, the redistribution of care work has to be equally pushed. A concrete proposal by Frigga Haug is the 4-in-1-perspective that proposes 4 hours of wage work per day, freeing time for 4 hours of care work, 4 hours of political activities in a direct democracy and 4 hours of personal development through learning.

Furthermore, degrowth draws on materialist ecofeminisms that state the parallel of the exploitation of women and nature in growth-based societies and proposes a subsistence perspective conceptualized by Maria Mies and Ariel Salleh. Identifying synergies and opportunities for cross-fertilization between degrowth and feminism is currently advancing, with the two discoures being connected through networks including the Feminisms and Degrowth Alliance (FaDA).

Intersectional feminism 

Additionally, feminist degrowth scholars stress the importance to build on intersectional feminism.
Intersectionality describes the simultaneous, multiple, overlapping, and contradictory systems of power that shape our lives and political options.
Intersectionality has become one of the key concepts of feminism in recent times. While hegemonic feminism was aimed at white middle-class women, that is, it was eminently a white feminism with very defined characteristics, intersectionality introduced much more disparate realities into the equation.

Legal scholar Kimberlé Crenshaw coined the term “intersectionality” in 1989 to describe how systems of oppression overlap to create distinct experiences for people with multiple identity categories. While this theory can be applied to all people, and more particularly all women, it is specifically mentioned and studied within the realms of black feminism and Critical Race Theory. Since its origins, African American scholars and activists criticized the essentialism of the concept of gender, and exposed the need for feminist scholars to be self-reflexive, self-critical and aware of their own positionality as a standpoint.

The emergence of the term intersectionality in fact coincides in time with the rise of third-wave feminism and postcolonial studies, expanding feminism to include women with diverse racial and cultural identities.

The strategy of turning to African American, postcolonial, and socialist feminist work to trace a genealogy of intersectionality pursues a twofold purpose. First, the concept of intersectionality is to be seen in the light of political struggles and theoretical interventions by the very women who are constructed as "the others" by mainstream feminism. Second, by shifting our attention towards the peripheral perspectives within feminism allows bringing them to the center, converting feminism into “the very house of difference” where all diversity among women can find their place.

Decolonialism

A relevant concept within the theory of degrowth is decolonialism, which refers to putting an end to the perpetuation of political, social, economic, religious, racial, gender, and epistemological relations of power, domination, and hierarchy of the global north over the global south.

The foundation of this relationship lies in understanding that the imminent socio-ecological collapse has been caused by capitalism, which is sustained due to economic growth. This economic growth in turn can only be maintained under the eaves of colonialism and extractivism, perpetuating asymmetric power relationships between territories. Colonialism is understood as the appropriation of common goods, resources and labor, which is antagonistic to degrowth principles.

Through colonial domination, capital depresses the prices of inputs and colonial cheapening occurs to the detriment of the oppressed countries. Degrowth criticizes these mechanisms of appropriation and enclosure of one territory over another and proposes a provision of human needs through disaccumulation, de-enclosure, and decommodification. It also reconciles with social movements and seeks to recognize the ecological debt to achieve the catch-up, which is postulated as impossible without decolonization.

In practice, decolonial practices close to degrowth are observed, such as the movement of Buen vivir or sumak kawsay by various indigenous peoples.

Origins of the movement

The contemporary degrowth movement can trace its roots back to the anti-industrialist trends of the 19th century, developed in Great Britain by John Ruskin, William Morris and the Arts and Crafts movement (1819–1900), in the United States by Henry David Thoreau (1817–1862), and in Russia by Leo Tolstoy (1828–1910).

The concept of "degrowth" proper appeared during the 1970s, proposed by André Gorz (1972) and intellectuals such as Nicholas Georgescu-Roegen, Jean Baudrillard, Edward Goldsmith, E.F. Schumacher, Erich Fromm, Paul Goodman and Ivan Illich, whose ideas reflect those of earlier thinkers, such as the economist E. J. Mishan, the industrial historian Tom Rolt, and the radical socialist Tony Turner. The writings of Mahatma Gandhi and J. C. Kumarappa also contain similar philosophies, particularly regarding his support of voluntary simplicity.

More generally, degrowth movements draw on the values of humanism, enlightenment, anthropology and human rights.

Club of Rome reports 

In 1968, the Club of Rome, a think tank headquartered in Winterthur, Switzerland, asked researchers at the Massachusetts Institute of Technology for a report on the limits of our world system and the constraints it puts on human numbers and activity. The report, called The Limits to Growth, published in 1972, became the first significant study to model the consequences of economic growth.

The reports (also known as the Meadows Reports) are not strictly the founding texts of the degrowth movement, as these reports only advise zero growth, and have also been used to support the sustainable development movement. Still, they are considered the first studies explicitly presenting economic growth as a key reason for the increase in global environmental problems such as pollution, shortage of raw materials, and the destruction of ecosystems. The Limits to Growth: The 30-Year Update was published in 2004, and in 2012, a 40-year forecast from Jørgen Randers, one of the book's original authors, was published as 2052: A Global Forecast for the Next Forty Years. In 2021, Club of Rome committee member Gaya Herrington published an article comparing the proposed models’ predictions against empirical data trends. The BAU2 (“Business as Usual 2”) scenario, predicting “collaps through pollution”, as well as the CT (“Comprehensive Technology”) scenario, predicting exceptional technological development and gradual decline, were found to align most closely with data observed as of 2019. In September 2022, the Club of Rome released updated predictive models and policy recommendations in a general-audiences book titled Earth for all – A survival guide to humanity.

Lasting influence of Georgescu-Roegen 

The degrowth movement recognises Romanian American mathematician, statistician and economist Nicholas Georgescu-Roegen as the main intellectual figure inspiring the movement.    In his work, The Entropy Law and the Economic Process, Georgescu-Roegen argues that economic scarcity is rooted in physical reality; that all natural resources are irreversibly degraded when put to use in economic activity; that the carrying capacity of Earth—that is, Earth's capacity to sustain human populations and consumption levels—is bound to decrease sometime in the future as Earth's finite stock of mineral resources is presently being extracted and put to use; and consequently, that the world economy as a whole is heading towards an inevitable future collapse.

Georgescu-Roegen's intellectual inspiration to degrowth dates back to the 1970s. When Georgescu-Roegen delivered a lecture at the University of Geneva in 1974, he made a lasting impression on the young, newly graduated French historian and philosopher, who had earlier been introduced to Georgescu-Roegen's works by an academic advisor. Georgescu-Roegen and Grinevald became friends, and Grinevald devoted his research to a closer study of Georgescu-Roegen's work. As a result, in 1979, Grinevald published a French translation of a selection of Georgescu-Roegen's articles entitled Demain la décroissance: Entropie – Écologie – Économie ('Tomorrow, the Decline: Entropy – Ecology – Economy'). Georgescu-Roegen, who spoke French fluently, approved the use of the term décroissance in the title of the French translation. The book gained influence in French intellectual and academic circles from the outset. Later, the book was expanded and republished in 1995, and once again in 2006; however, the word Demain ('tomorrow') was removed from the title of the book in the second and third editions.

By the time Grinevald suggested the term décroissance to form part of the title of the French translation of Georgescu-Roegen's work, the term had already permeated French intellectual circles since the early-1970s to signify a deliberate political action to downscale the economy on a permanent and voluntary basis. Simultaneously, but independently, Georgescu-Roegen criticised the ideas of The Limits to Growth and Herman Daly's steady-state economy in his article, "Energy and Economic Myths", delivered as a series of lectures from 1972, but not published before 1975. In the article, Georgescu-Roegen stated the following:

When reading this particular passage of the text, Grinevald realised that no professional economist of any orientation had ever reasoned like this before. Grinevald also realised the congruence of Georgescu-Roegen's viewpoint and the French debates occurring at the time; this resemblance was captured in the title of the French edition. Taken together, the translation of Georgescu-Roegen's work into French both fed on and gave further impetus to the concept of décroissance in France—and everywhere else in the francophone world—thereby creating something of an intellectual feedback loop.  

By the 2000s, when décroissance was to be translated from French back into English as the catchy banner for the new social movement, the original term "decline" was deemed inappropriate and misdirected for the purpose: "Decline" usually refers to an unexpected, unwelcome, and temporary economic recession, something to be avoided or quickly overcome. Instead, the neologism "degrowth" was coined to signify a deliberate political action to downscale the economy on a permanent, conscious basis—as in the prevailing French usage of the term—something good to be welcomed and maintained, or so followers believe.  

When the first international degrowth conference was held in Paris in 2008, the participants honoured Georgescu-Roegen and his work. In his manifesto on Petit traité de la décroissance sereine ("Farewell to Growth"), the leading French champion of the degrowth movement, Serge Latouche, credited Georgescu-Roegen as the "main theoretical source of degrowth". Likewise, Italian degrowth theorist Mauro Bonaiuti considered Georgescu-Roegen's work to be "one of the analytical cornerstones of the degrowth perspective".

Serge Latouche 

Serge Latouche, a professor of economics at the University of Paris-Sud, has noted that:

Schumacher and Buddhist economics 
E. F. Schumacher's 1973 book Small Is Beautiful predates a unified degrowth movement, but nonetheless serves as an important basis for degrowth ideas. In this book he critiques the neo-liberal model of economic development, arguing that an increasing "standard of living", based on consumption, is absurd as a goal of economic activity and development. Instead, under what he refers to as Buddhist economics, we should aim to maximize well-being while minimizing consumption.

Ecological and social issues 
In January 1972, Edward Goldsmith and Robert Prescott-Allen—editors of The Ecologist—published A Blueprint for Survival, which called for a radical programme of decentralisation and deindustrialization to prevent what the authors referred to as "the breakdown of society and the irreversible disruption of the life-support systems on this planet".

In 2019, a summary for policymakers of the largest, most comprehensive study to date of biodiversity and ecosystem services was published by the Intergovernmental Science-Policy Platform on Biodiversity and Ecosystem Services. The report was finalised in Paris. The main conclusions:

1. Over the last 50 years, the state of nature has deteriorated at an unprecedented and accelerating rate.

2. The main drivers of this deterioration have been changes in land and sea use, exploitation of living beings, climate change, pollution and invasive species. These five drivers, in turn, are caused by societal behaviors, from consumption to governance.

3. Damage to ecosystems undermines 35 of 44 selected UN targets, including the UN General Assembly's Sustainable Development Goals for poverty, hunger, health, water, cities' climate, oceans and land. It can cause problems with food, water and humanity's air supply.

4. To fix the problem, humanity needs transformative change, including sustainable agriculture, reductions in consumption and waste, fishing quotas and collaborative water management. Page 8 of the report proposes "enabling visions of a good quality of life that do not entail ever-increasing material consumption" as one of the main measures. The report states that "Some pathways chosen to achieve the goals related to energy, economic growth, industry and infrastructure and sustainable consumption and production (Sustainable Development Goals 7, 8, 9 and 12), as well as targets related to poverty, food security and cities (Sustainable Development Goals 1, 2 and 11), could have substantial positive or negative impacts on nature and therefore on the achievement of other Sustainable Development Goals".

In a paper published in June 2020, a group of scientists argue that "green growth" or "sustainable growth" is a myth: "we have to get away from our obsession with economic growth—we really need to start managing our economies in a way that protects our climate and natural resources, even if this means less, no or even negative growth." They conclude that a change in economic paradigms is imperative to prevent environmental destruction.

In June 2020 the official site of one of the organizations promoting degrowth published an article written by Vijay Kolinjivadi, an expert in political ecology, that explains how the creation of the Coronavirus disease 2019 is linked to the ecological crisis.

The 2019 World Scientists' Warning of a Climate Emergency and its 2021 update have asserted that economic growth is a primary driver of the overexploitation of ecosystems, and in order to preserve the biosphere and mitigate climate change civilization must, in addition to other fundamental changes including stabilizing population growth and adopting largely plant-based diets, "shift from GDP growth and the pursuit of affluence toward sustaining ecosystems and improving human well-being by prioritizing basic needs and reducing inequality."

Degrowth movement

Conferences
The movement has included international conferences  promoted by the network Research & Degrowth (R&D). The First International Conference on Economic Degrowth for Ecological Sustainability and Social Equity in Paris (2008) was a discussion about the financial, social, cultural, demographic, and environmental crisis caused by the deficiencies of capitalism and an explanation of the main principles of degrowth. Further conferences were in Barcelona (2010), Montreal (2012), Venice (2012), Leipzig (2014), Budapest (2016), and Malmö (2018).

Barcelona Conference (2010)
The Second International Conference in Barcelona focused on specific ways to implement a degrowth society.

Concrete proposals have been developed for future political actions, including:
 Promotion of local currencies, elimination of fiat money and reforms of interest
 Transition to non-profit and small scale companies
 Increase of local commons and support of participative approaches in decision-making
 Reducing working hours and facilitation of volunteer work
 Reusing empty housing and cohousing
 Introduction of the basic income and an income ceiling built on a maximum-minimum ratio
 Limitation of the exploitation of natural resources and preservation of the biodiversity and culture by regulations, taxes and compensations
 Minimize the waste production with education and legal instruments
 Elimination of mega infrastructures, transition from a car-based system to a more local, biking, walking-based one.
 Suppression of advertising from the public space

The Barcelona conference had little influence on the world economic and political order. Criticism of the proposals arrived at in Barcelona, mostly financial, have inhibited change.

Degrowth around the world 
Although not explicitly called degrowth, movements inspired by similar concepts and terminologies can be found around the world, including Buen Vivir in Latin America, the Zapatistas in Mexico, the Kurdish Rojava or Eco-Swaraj in India, and the sufficiency economy in Thailand.

Relation to other social movements 
The degrowth movement has a variety of relations to other social movements and alternative economic visions, which range from collaboration to partial overlap. The Konzeptwerk Neue Ökonomie (Laboratory for New Economic Ideas), which hosted the 2014 international Degrowth conference in Leipzig, has published a project entitled "Degrowth in movement(s)" in 2017, which maps relationships with 32 other social movements and initiatives. The relation to the environmental justice movement is especially visible.

Another set of movements the degrowth movement finds synergy with is the wave of initiatives and networks inspired by the commons. Some main networks of commons include: School of Commoning in Barcelona, Commoning Europe, and the Commons-Institute in Germany. The main overlap stems from a high level of self organization to sustainably share resources through a different logic outside of capitalist organization. This is directly countering the hyper privatization currently embedded in contemporary capitalism which both movements are attempting to counter in some way. For example, initiatives inspired by commons could be food cooperatives, open-source platforms, and group management of resources such as energy or water. These decentralized, direct democratic forms of self-management relate to the degrowth movement in terms of inclusive political representation, where the people are actively involved in the production and distribution of shared resources. In short, the movements have shared values of inclusion, sustainable use of resources, self-organization, conviviality, shared knowledge production and emphasize use value over exchange value.

Criticisms, challenges and dilemmas 
Critiques of degrowth concern the negative connotation that the term "degrowth" imparts, the misapprehension that growth is seen as unambiguously bad, the challenges and feasibility of a degrowth transition, as well as the entanglement of desirable aspects of modernity with the growth paradigm.

Criticisms

Negative connotation 
The use of the term "degrowth" is criticized for being detrimental to the degrowth movement because it could carry a negative connotation, in opposition to the positively perceived "growth". "Growth" is associated with the "up" direction and positive experiences, while "down" generates the opposite associations. Research in political psychology has shown that the initial negative association of a concept, such as of "degrowth" with the negatively perceived "down", can bias how the subsequent information on that concept is integrated at the unconscious level. At the conscious level, degrowth can be interpreted negatively as the contraction of the economy, although this is not the goal of a degrowth transition, but rather one of its expected consequences. In the current economic system, a contraction of the economy is associated with a recession and its ensuing austerity measures, job cuts, or lower salaries. Noam Chomsky commented on the use of the term: "When you say 'degrowth' it frightens people. It's like saying you're going to have to be poorer tomorrow than you are today, and it doesn't mean that."

Since "degrowth" contains the term "growth", there is also a risk of the term having a backfire effect, which would reinforce the initial positive attitude toward growth. "Degrowth" is also criticized for being a confusing term, since its aim is not to halt economic growth as the word implies. Instead, "a-growth" is proposed as an alternative term that emphasizes that growth ceases to be an important policy objective, but that it can still be achieved as a side-effect of environmental and social policies.

Marxist critique

Traditional Marxists distinguish between two types of value creation: that which is useful to mankind, and that which only serves the purpose of accumulating capital. Traditional Marxists consider that it is the exploitative nature and control of the capitalist production relations that is the determinant and not the quantity. According to Jean Zin, while the justification for degrowth is valid, it is not a solution to the problem. Other Marxist writers have adopted positions close to the de-growth perspective. For example, John Bellamy Foster and Fred Magdoff, in common with David Harvey, Immanuel Wallerstein, Paul Sweezy and others focus on endless capital accumulation as the basic principle and goal of capitalism. This is the source of economic growth and, in the view of these writers, results in an unsustainable growth imperative. Foster and Magdoff develop Marx's own concept of the metabolic rift, something he noted in the exhaustion of soils by capitalist systems of food production, though this is not unique to capitalist systems of food production as seen in the Aral Sea. Many degrowth theories and ideas are based on neo-Marxist theory.

Systems theoretical critique
In stressing the negative rather than the positive side(s) of growth, the majority of degrowth proponents remain focused on (de-)growth, thus co-performing and further sustaining the actually criticized unsustainable growth obsession. One way out of this paradox might be in changing the reductionist vision of growth as ultimately an economic concept, which proponents of both growth and degrowth commonly imply, for a broader concept of growth that allows for the observation of growth in other function systems of society. A corresponding recoding of growth-obsessed or capitalist organizations has been proposed.

Challenges

Lack of macroeconomics for sustainability 
There is still no macroeconomic model that can describe a stable economy which does not rely on growth. So far, the modern economy is structurally reliant on economic growth for its stability. If growth slows down, businesses will struggle, the unemployment rate will go up, and politicians will panic and spiral up recession looms. It is reasonable for society to worry about recession as economic growth has been the unanimous goal around the globe in the past decades. However, in some advanced countries, there are attempts to develop a model for a regrowth economy. For instance, the Cool Japan strategy has proven to be instructive for Japan, which has been a static economy for almost decades. Though, there is no place in the world where degrowth fully exists on a large scale. Consequently, degrowth opponents make a valid argument by saying that degrowth is to some extent utopian.

Political and social spheres 
The growth imperative is deeply entrenched in market capitalist societies such that it is necessary for their stability. Moreover, the institutions of modern societies, such as the nation state, welfare, the labor market, education, academia, law and finance, have co-evolved along growth to sustain it. A degrowth transition thus requires not only a change of the economic system but of all the systems on which it relies. As most people in modern societies are dependent on those growth-oriented institutions, the challenge of a degrowth transition also lies in the individual resistance to move away from growth.

Land privatisation 
Baumann, Alexander and Burdon  suggest that "the Degrowth movement needs to give more attention to land and housing costs, which are significant barriers hindering true political and economic agency and any grassroots driven degrowth transition."
In essence, they are saying that it is the fact that land (something we all need like air and water) has been privatised that creates an absolute economic growth determinant. They point out that even if one is committed to degrowth, they have no option but decades of market growth buy-in to pay the rent or mortgage. Because of this, land privatisation is a structural impediment to moving forward that makes degrowth economically and politically unviable. They conclude that because degrowth, as a movement, has not yet dealt with land privatisation (the markets inaugural privatisation - Primitive Accumulation) it has not yet been able to develop a strategy that does not perpetuate the very growth that it positions as problematic. Just as land enclosure (privatisation) initiated capitalism (economic growth), degrowth must start with a reclaiming of land commons.

Agriculture 
A degrowth society would require a shift from industrial agriculture to less intensive and more sustainable agricultural practices such as permaculture or organic agriculture, but it is not clear if any of those alternatives could feed the current and projected global population. In the case of organic agriculture, Germany, for example, would not be able to feed its population under ideal organic yields over all of its arable land without meaningful changes to patterns of consumption, such as reducing meat consumption and food waste. Moreover, labour productivity of non-industrial agriculture is significantly lower due to the reduced use or absence of fossil fuels, which leaves much less labour for other sectors. Potential solutions to this challenge include scaling up approaches such as community-supported agriculture (CSA).

Dilemmas 
Given that modernity has emerged with high levels of energy and material throughput, there is an apparent compromise between desirable aspects of modernity (e.g., social justice, gender equality, long life expectancy, low infant mortality) and unsustainable levels of energy and material use. Some researchers, however, argue that the decline in income inequality and rise in social mobility occurring under capitalism from the late 1940s to the 1960s was a product of the heavy bargaining power of labor unions and increased wealth and income redistribution during that time; while also pointing to the rise in income inequality in the 1970s following the collapse of labor unions and weakening of state welfare measures. Others also argue that modern capitalism maintains gender inequalities by means of advertising, messaging in consumer goods, and social media. Furthermore, as of 2021, Cuba, a country with a state-run healthcare system, had an under-five mortality rate of 5.1 per 1,000 live births while the United States, a country with no form of universal healthcare coverage, had an under-five mortality rate of 6.5 per 1,000 live births. Data from UNICEF exhibits that higher ranking health metrics such as life expectancy are not synonymous with capitalist or privatized healthcare systems. Ultimately, the claim that capitalism and certain desirable aspects of modernity are codependent is contentious.

Another way of looking at the argument that the development of desirable aspects of modernity require unsustainable energy and material use is through the lens of the Marxist tradition, which relates the superstructure (culture, ideology, institutions) and the base (material conditions of life, division of labor). A degrowth society, with its drastically different material conditions, could produce equally drastic changes in the cultural and ideological spheres of society. The political economy of global capitalism has generated a lot of bads, such as socioeconomic inequality and ecological devastation, which have engendered a lot of goods through individualization and increased spatial and social mobility. At the same time, some argue the widespread individualization promulgated by a capitalist political economy is a bad due to its undermining of solidarity, aligned with democracy as well as collective, secondary, and primary forms of caring, and simultaneous encouragement of mistrust of others, highly competitive interpersonal relationships, blame of failure on individual shortcomings, prioritization of one's self-interest, and peripheralization of the conceptualization of human work required to create and sustain people. In this view, the widespread individuation resulting from capitalism may impede degrowth measures, requiring a change in actions to benefit society rather than the individual self.

Some argue the political economy of capitalism has allowed social emancipation at the level of gender equality, disability, sexuality and anti-racism that has no historical precedent. However, others dispute social emancipation as being a direct product of capitalism or question the emancipation that has resulted. The feminist writer Nancy Holmstrom, for example, argues that capitalism's negative impacts on women outweigh the positive impacts, and women tend to be hurt by the system. In her examination of China following the Chinese Communist Revolution, Holmstrom notes that women were granted state-assisted freedoms to equal education, childcare, healthcare, abortion, marriage, and other social supports. Thus, the point of whether the social emancipation achieved in Western society under capitalism may coexist with degrowth is ambiguous.

Doyal and Gough allege that the modern capitalist system is built on the exploitation of female reproductive labor as well as that of the Global South, and sexism and racism are embedded in its structure. Therefore, some theories (such as Eco-Feminism or political ecology) argue that there cannot be equality regarding gender and the hierarchy between the Global North and South within capitalism.

The structural properties of growth present another barrier to degrowth as growth shapes and is enforced by institutions, norms, culture, technology, identities, etc. The social ingraining of growth manifests in peoples' aspirations, thinking, bodies, mindsets, and relationships. Together, growth's role in social practices and in socio-economic institutions present unique challenges to the success of the degrowth movement. Another potential barrier to degrowth is the need for a rapid transition to a degrowth society due to climate change and the potential negative impacts of a rapid social transition including disorientation, conflict, and decreased wellbeing.

In the United States, a large barrier to the support of the degrowth movement is the modern education system, including both primary and higher learning institutions. Beginning in the second term of the Reagan administration, the education system in the US was restructured to enforce neoliberal ideology by means of privatization schemes such as commercialization and performance contracting, implementation of standards and accountability measures incentivizing schools to adopt a uniform curriculum, and higher education accreditation and curricula designed to affirm market values and current power structures and avoid critical thought concerning the relations between those in power, ethics, authority, history, and knowledge. The degrowth movement, based on the empirical assumption that resources are finite and growth is limited, clashes with the limitless growth ideology associated with neoliberalism and the market values affirmed in schools, and therefore faces a major social barrier in gaining widespread support in the US.

Nevertheless, co-evolving aspects of global capitalism, liberal modernity, and the market society, are closely tied and will be difficult to separate to maintain liberal and cosmopolitan values in a degrowth society. At the same time, the goal of the degrowth movement is progression rather than regression, and researchers point out that neoclassical economic models indicate neither negative nor zero growth would harm economic stability or full employment. Several assert the main barriers to the movement are social and structural factors clashing with the implementation of degrowth measures.

Healthcare 
It has been pointed out that there is an apparent trade-off between the ability of modern healthcare systems to treat individual bodies to their last breath and the broader global ecological risk of such an energy and resource intensive care. If this trade-off exists, a degrowth society would have to choose between prioritizing the ecological integrity and the ensuing collective health or maximizing the healthcare provided to individuals. However, many degrowth scholars argue that the current system produces both psychological and physical damage to people. They insist that societal prosperity should be measured by well-being, not GDP.

See also 

 A Blueprint for Survival
 Anarcho-primitivism
 Anti-capitalism
 Anti-consumerism
 Collapsology
 Critique of political economy
 Degrowth advocates (category)
 Downshifting (lifestyle)
 Ecological economics
 Genuine progress indicator
 GROWL
 L-shaped recession
 Political ecology
 Postdevelopment theory
 Power Down: Options and Actions for a Post-Carbon World
 Paradox of thrift
 The Path to Degrowth in Overdeveloped Countries
 Post-consumerism
 Post-growth
 Productivism
 Prosperity Without Growth
 Simple living
 Slow movement
 Steady-state economy
 Transition town
 Uneconomic growth
 Voluntary childlessness
 Wealth, Virtual Wealth and Debt

References

References

Further reading

External links 
 First International De-growth Conference in Paris 18-19 April 2008
 2nd Conference on Economic Degrowth for Ecological Sustainability and Social Equity. Barcelona 26-29 March 2010
 International Conference on Degrowth in the Americas, Montreal, 13-19 May 2012
 3 hours of audio from Montreal 2012, The Extraenvironmentalist (podcast)
 Video Interviews and Speeches from Montreal 2012, The Extraenvironmentalist
 3rd International Conference on degrowth for ecological sustainability and social equity (Venice, 19-23 September 2012)
 Peter Ainsworth on degrowth and sustainable development Published on La Clé des langues
 CBC Ideas podcast "The Degrowth Paradigm"; 54 minutes (Toronto 10 December 2013) 

 
Simple living
Sustainability
Green politics
Ecological economics
Environmental movements
Environmental ethics
Environmental economics
Environmental social science concepts